Eveline Willett Cunnington (23 April 1849 – 30 July 1916) was a British-born social reformer, feminist, lecturer and writer in New Zealand. Cunnington was a strong advocate against the exploitation of children and young women and for prison reform.  In later years, she advocated for socialism and labor reform.

Early life and education

Cunnington was born Eveline Willett Leach in Briton Ferry, Glamorganshire, Wales, on 23 April 1849. Her father, Robert Valentine Leach, owned a lunatic asylum. As a young woman, Cunningham wanted to get a job, but her father would not allow it.  He sent her to school in France, after which she spent time in Italy and Germany.  Back in England, Cunnington attended at Queen's College in London for three years. 

In 1875, Cunnington emigrated to Christchurch, New Zealand.  On 8 April 1876, she married Capel Baines.  The couple moved to South Australia, where he worked as a clerk. They lived in poverty; Cunnington later stated that this experience radicalized her feelings on the subject.  Cunningham had two children in Australia.

In August 1883, on a visit to Cunnington's family in England, Capel died of a heart attack.  She and her children left England for Christchurch.  On 18 December 1884, she married Herbert James Cunnington, an electrical engineer, in Leithfield.  The couple had one daughter.

Later life

In 1891, Cunnington became a member of the ladies' committee of the Canterbury Female Refuge, which assisted unmarried pregnant women, In 1895, she became a prison visitor, one of the first women to hold that position there.  In 1896, Cunnington became a founding member of the National Council of Women of New Zealand.  She also helped found a branch of the Fabian Society in Canterbury.  

In politics, Cunnington campaigned to raise the age of consent and to make it illegal for minor girls to work in brothels Cunnington believed that pimps and customers of prostitution should be arrested and prosecuted.  She opposed the Contagious Diseases Acts due to the double standards it placed on women. 

Cunnington also wanted to add more female employees in the prison system to combat the sexual exploitation of female inmates by male employees.  She also campaigned for the education of prisoners. Cunnington assisted many young women released from prison, providing clothes and accommodation, often in her own home.

In 1904, Cunnington went to England for a three-year stay.  During this period, she met the writer Mary Ernest Boole,  the poor-law guardian, Ina Stansfield, Millicent Garrett Fawcett, Lady Isabella Caroline Somerset and Susan B. Anthony.  After surviving a serious illness, Cunnington returned to Christchurch in 1908.

Back in New Zealand, Cunnington spent the next two years in education efforts with older girls and other charitable occupations.  In 1910, she started giving lectures to working men regarding socialism and Christianity in Christchurch and Wellington.  

By 1913, Cunnington's health had started to decline.  However, she continued to advocate for socialism and the rights of organized labor.  Herbert Cunnington died in 2015.

Cunnington died on 30 July 1916 at her holiday home in Sumner. Her written works were published posthumously in 1918.

References

1849 births
1916 deaths
New Zealand educators
New Zealand feminists
Welsh emigrants to New Zealand
New Zealand writers
New Zealand activists
New Zealand women activists
19th-century New Zealand people